Dixie is a neighbourhood in the city of Mississauga, Ontario, Canada. The community lies in the southeastern part of the city and is one of the older neighbourhoods in the city.

The name of the neighbourhood dates back to the Village of Dixie at the corner of Cawthra Road and Dundas Street West in the south part of the city. In 1865, the village of Sydenham was renamed in honour of Beaumont Wilson Bowen Dixie (1819-1898), a Welsh settler who paid for the establishment of the Union Chapel, a multi-denominal Protestant church in the village originally built in 1816 (and rebuilt in 1837). The church is also home to  St. John's Dixie Union Cemetery, an active cemetery since 1816. The Chapel was built from donations from the Cody family of Buffalo Bill fame and was where his son was baptized in 1847.

Today, much of the area is commercial or industrial use with a small area of residential homes east of Dixie Road.

References

External links
PDF of Dixie: Orchards to Industry by Kathleen A. Hicks
Link to 4 books by Dave Cook - Apple Blossoms and Satellite Dishes, the history of the Applewood Acres community, From Frozen Ponds to Beehive Glory, the story of Dixie Arena Gardens, Fading History Vol. 1 which includes a chapter on the 2000-seat Broadway music theatre under a tent at Dixie Plaza and Fading History Vol. 2 which includes a chapter about the Kennedy clan from Dixie.

Neighbourhoods in Mississauga